is a Japanese actor and voice actor from Tokyo, Japan.

Early life
He was born in Setagaya, Tokyo. His older brother is Naoyuki Matsuda, a musical translator and professor at Komazawa University. After studying at Aoyama Gakuin High School, he dropped out of Aoyama Gakuin University's Faculty of Letters and Department of Education. Among his classmates is a member of the Diet and the House of Councilors Renhō (his classmate from high school to university). He joined the Himawari Theatre Group at age five and made his child debut in the TV drama Mother's Suzu in 1974.

He gained attention as an actor in the 1983 TBS television drama Family Game (as Shigeyuki Numata). He appeared in Nausicaä of the Valley of the Wind in 1984, and in 1987, portrayed the main character Shuna in Shuna's Journey. In 1997, he voiced Ashitaka in the anime movie Princess Mononoke, and voiced Leonardo DiCaprio's role Jack Dawson in the American film Titanic to raise his profile. In 2006, he taught acting as a lecturer at Tokyo Animation College. He became active around the stage, working with directors such as Yukio Ninagawa and Yoji Aoi. He appeared in the drama From the North Country.

Filmography

Film
Blue Christmas (1978) (Osamu Min)
Komugiiro no Tenshi: Suzume to Shōnen (1978) (Sabu)
Hana no Asuka-gumi! (1988) (Kasuga)
Dogura magura (1988) (Ichirō Kure)
Riyū (2004) (Wealthy person's husband)
The Hidden Blade (2004)
Kappa (2006)
Kabei: Our Mother (2008) (Shimazaki)
Character (2021)

Television
Tokugawa Ieyasu (1983) (Matsudaira Motoyasu)

Radio drama
Shuna's Journey (1987) (Shuna)

Television animation
Ghost in the Shell: Stand Alone Complex (2002) (Marshall McLachlan)
Kurau Phantom Memory (2004) (Vint)
A Spirit of the Sun (2006) (Ichirō Yanagi)

Theatrical animation
Nausicaä of the Valley of the Wind (1984) (Asbel)
Princess Mononoke (1997) (Ashitaka)
The Girl Who Leapt Through Time (2006) (Sōjirō Takase)

Video games
Octopath Traveler II (2023) (Hikari Ku)

Tokusatsu
Kamen Rider Amazon (1974) (Masahiko Okamura)

Narration
Sekai Fureaki Machi Aruki (????)

CD
Hakkiya Kōshō (????) (Akama)
Kaze Hikaru (????) (Okita Sōji)

Dubbing roles
The Art of More (Thomas Graham Connor (Christian Cooke))
The Beach (Richard (Leonardo DiCaprio))
Titanic (Jack Dawson (Leonardo DiCaprio))
Good Morning, Vietnam (Tuan (Tung Thanh Tran))
Inception (2012 TV Asahi edition) (Arthur (Joseph Gordon-Levitt))
Spring Waltz (Yoon Jae-ha/Su-ho (Seo Do-young))

References

External links
 Official blog 
 Official agency profile 
 
 

1967 births
Living people
Japanese male child actors
Japanese male film actors
Japanese male video game actors
Japanese male voice actors
Japanese radio personalities
Male voice actors from Tokyo
20th-century Japanese male actors
21st-century Japanese male actors
People from Setagaya
Male voice actors from Setagaya